The Cathedral of Saints Simon and Jude is the cathedral of the Roman Catholic Diocese of Phoenix.

History
The parish was established by Bishop Daniel James Gercke on May 15, 1953, when it was still part of the Diocese of Tucson. The founding pastor was Reverend Paul Smith, a native of Ireland, who brought with him the Sisters of Loreto. Fr. Smith celebrated Masses in the Maryland School while a temporary church was built. It was dedicated on October 17, 1954. The current building was dedicated on December 11, 1966, and became a cathedral with the formation of the Diocese of Phoenix in 1969, elevated to cathedral status under Pope Paul VI.

The current rector is the Very Rev. Fernando Camou and the cathedral is overseen by the current bishop of the Diocese of Phoenix, Bishop John P. Dolan. The Auxiliary Bishop is Bishop Eduardo Alanis Nevares (ordained July 19, 2010).

Adjacent to the cathedral is the Saints Simon and Jude Catholic School. Other buildings on the campus of the school include the Mary Ward House. Standing in front of the cathedral is a large cross over a dome-like structure that stood over the temporary altar where Pope John Paul II celebrated Mass when he visited Phoenix.

In 2016, the Cathedral saw the installation of a new 51-rank pipe organ built by the Peragallo Pipe Organ Company, the first pipe organ to be installed at the Cathedral.

Rectors
 Rev. Paul P. Smith, 1953–unknown
 Rev. Michael McGovern, unknown–1987
 Monsignor Richard Moyer, 1987–1990
 Monsignor Michael O'Grady, 1990–2005
 Rev. Robert Clements, 2005–2010
 Rev. John Lankeit, 2010–2021
 Very Rev. Fernando Camou 2021–

School
The school teaches kindergarten through eighth grade and is staffed by the Sisters of Loreto.

The school was founded in 1954 by Bishop Daniel J. Gerke of Tucson and Reverend Paul P. Smith. On August 20, 1954, four Sisters of Loreto from the Order of the Institute of the Blessed Virgin Mary arrived from Navan, Ireland to staff the new school.

Historic visitors
 Pope John Paul II visited the cathedral on September 14, 1987.
 Mother Teresa of Calcutta visited the cathedral in May 1989.

Images

See also
 List of Catholic cathedrals in the United States
 List of cathedrals in the United States

References

External links

 
 Roman Catholic Diocese of Phoenix Official Site
 Official website of SSJ School

Simon and Jude, Cathedral of
Catholic Church in Arizona
Simon and Jude, Cathedral of
Simon and Jude, Cathedral of
Roman Catholic churches in Phoenix, Arizona
Christian organizations established in 1953
Roman Catholic churches completed in 1966
Modernist architecture in Arizona
Cathedrals in Arizona
20th-century Roman Catholic church buildings in the United States